Augustin Ahimana is a Rwandan Anglican bishop. He is a bishop in the Province of the Anglican Church of Rwanda. He is Head of Planning and Development for the Province of the Episcopal Church of Rwanda. Bishop Ahimana built a team for the Athens Olympics in 2004. He was consecrated bishop of the Kivu Diocese on 21 December 2008.

Attack on humanitarian organizations
Writing in the magazine Christianity Today, Ahimana rejected criticism of the Rwandan government by non-governmental organizations:
It is also our duty to inform American Christians that there has been a malicious campaign to demonize Rwanda's leaders, distorting the political situation. This distortion emanates from people often hiding behind so-called humanitarian organizations. Some have a hidden agenda of distracting the international community so that their own role in Rwanda's tragedy cannot be exposed.

Defense of Rwandan invasions of the DRC
Bishop Ahimana defended the Rwandan invasions of the Democratic Republic of the Congo, which led to the First Congo War and the Second Congo War:
When Rwandan troops decided to pursue the genocidal forces and their sponsors in the Democratic Republic of Congo (DRC) in 1996 and 1998, they did so in the light of day. The peace we enjoy today in our country is mainly a consequence of that action.

References

External links
 World Vision work
Rev Augustin Ahimana leads Purpose Driven Missionaries

Year of birth missing (living people)
Living people
People from Musanze District
Rwandan Anglicans
21st-century Anglican bishops in Africa
Rwandan bishops
Anglican bishops of Kivu